Horn Spire is a  mountain summit located in the Boundary Ranges of the Coast Mountains, in the U.S. state of Alaska. Horn Spire is the highest point of the Icefall Spires, and although modest in elevation, relief is significant since the north face of the mountain rises over 4,700 feet above the Thiel Glacier in less than one mile. The peak's descriptive name was submitted in 1965 by Maynard Miller, director of the Juneau Icefield Research Project, and officially adopted that same year by the U.S. Board on Geographic Names. The first ascent of the peak was made June 30, 1973, by Dick Benedict, Gerry Buckley, Craig Lingle, and Bruce Tickell.

Climate

Based on the Köppen climate classification, Horn Spire has a subarctic climate with cold, snowy winters, and cool summers. Temperatures can drop below −20 °C with wind chill factors below −30 °C. The months May and June offer the most favorable weather for viewing this rarely climbed peak.

See also

List of mountain peaks of Alaska
Geography of Alaska

References

External links
 Horn Spire: weather
 Horn Spire: Flickr photo

Mountains of Alaska
Mountains of Juneau, Alaska
Boundary Ranges
North American 2000 m summits